Billund may refer to:
 Billund, Denmark, a town
 Billund Municipality, a kommune in the Region of Southern Denmark
 Billund Airport, the airport near Billund, Denmark